The Future of Art is a 2010 documentary film by Erik Niedling and Ingo Niermann. It features interviews with protagonists of the contemporary art scene and premiered on 10 November 2010 in Berlin. The film was released on DVD in September 2011 accompanied by the book The Future of Art. A Manual, published by Sternberg Press.

Subsequent to the premiere screening, the movie was playing at the Angermuseum in Erfurt from 10 to 28 November 2010. Until May 2011 the interviews were also shown as a web series at 3min.de, a video-sharing site of Deutsche Telekom.

The movie was mainly shot in Berlin, Hamburg, Frankfurt and New York.

Structure 
The documentary starts with a short prologue (Niermann taking a bath in the Schlachtensee lake in Berlin), followed by the actual interviews which are divided into four main chapters:

I. Investigation
II. Creation
III. Incubation
IV. Presentation

In the interview series, the focus is on how the art business works and how an artist can be successful and create a lasting work of art. In the course of the film, Niermann develops the idea for an epochal work of art in an exemplary manner. Niermann then develops the concept of a pyramid.

The pyramid would be peeled out of a mountain or hill several hundred meters high. The work would be financed by a collector who would then be buried inside the pyramid thus created. After the death of the collector, the demolished material must be piled up again. The pyramid is to disappear.

The film ends at the Wachsenburg in Thuringia. Niedling and Niermann present their idea to the lord of the castle. They ask how much a collector would have to pay to have the castle temporarily pulled down and then the pyramid peeled out of the mountain as planned.

Featured artists, curators, collectors, and critics include (in order of appearance):

References

External links

Review by Monopol magazine, November 10, 2010 (in German)
Review by art magazine, November 12, 2010 (in German)
Interview with the producers, The Tait Global, November 23, 2011

2010 films
German documentary films
2010s German-language films
Documentary films about visual artists
2010s English-language films
2010s German films